Corey William Brown (born October 1, 1974) is an American politician and a former Republican member of the South Dakota Senate representing District 23 from 2009 to 2017.

Education
Brown earned his BA in government and international relations from the University of Notre Dame and his MA from the University of San Diego.

State Senate Elections
2014 Brown was unopposed for both the June 3, 2014 Republican Primary and the November 4, 2014 General election, winning with 6,827 votes.
2012 Brown was unopposed for both the June 5, 2012 Republican Primary and the November 6, 2012 General election, winning with 8,029 votes.
2010 Brown was unopposed for both the June 8, 2010 Republican Primary and the November 2, 2010 General election, winning with 6,455 votes.
2008 When District 23 incumbent Republican Senator Jay Duenwald left the Legislature and left the seat open, Brown won the June 3, 2008 Republican Primary with 2,116 votes (59.79%) against state Representative Tom Hackl, and won the November 4, 2008 General election with 5,988 votes (64.06%) against Democratic nominee Nicholas Nemec.

References

External links
Official page at the South Dakota Legislature

Corey Brown at Ballotpedia
Corey Brown at the National Institute on Money in State Politics

Living people
People from Potter County, South Dakota
Place of birth missing (living people)
Republican Party South Dakota state senators
University of Notre Dame alumni
University of San Diego alumni
1974 births
21st-century American politicians